Sandy Creek is a rural locality in the Somerset Region, Queensland, Australia.

Geography
Sandy Creek is located northeast of Kilcoy in South East Queensland.

Many parts of Sandy Creek are elevated along the southern Conondale Range and some of the range is protected within Bellthorpe National Park.

The locality has the following mountains:

 Mount Ann in the south-west of the locality, rising to  
 Mount Marysmokes in the east of the locality, rising to

History
Winya State School opened in 1918 and closed in 1960. The school was on a  site on the north-east corner of the D'Aguilar Highway and Sandy Creek Road now within the locality of Sandy Creek.Hubners Bridge, also known as Hubner Bridge, is a road bridge on the Sandy Creek Road over Sandy Creek. The bridge was washed away on  during the catastrophic 2010–2011 floods. A flying-fox was built across Sandy Creek to provide supplies to residents stranded due to bridge damage.

Education
There are no schools in Sandy Creek. The nearest government primary schools are Mount Kilcoy State School in neighbouring Mount Kilcoy to the west and Kilcoy State School in Kilcoy to the south-west. The nearest government secondary school is Kilcoy State High School in Kilcoy.

References

External links

Suburbs of Somerset Region
Localities in Queensland